Alton Andrew Meiring (born 5 March 1976 in Cape Town) is a South African football (soccer) striker for several Premier Soccer League clubs and South Africa.

External links

1976 births
Living people
Sportspeople from Cape Town
Cape Coloureds
South African soccer players
Hellenic F.C. players
Cape Town Spurs F.C. players
Mamelodi Sundowns F.C. players
AmaZulu F.C. players
Manning Rangers F.C. players
Lamontville Golden Arrows F.C. players
Moroka Swallows F.C. players
Platinum Stars F.C. players
Jomo Cosmos F.C. players
Association football forwards
South Africa international soccer players
South African Premier Division players
National First Division players